In mathematics, Grothendieck duality may refer to:
Coherent duality of coherent sheaves
Grothendieck local duality of modules over a local ring